"Anniversary" is a song by American R&B group Tony! Toni! Toné!. It was released on September 14, 1993, as the second single from their studio album Sons of Soul (1993). The song was produced by Tony! Toni! Toné! and written by group member Raphael Wiggins and keyboardist Carl Wheeler.

The song became a hit for Tony! Toni! Toné!, peaking at number 10 on the Billboard Hot 100 and at number two on the Hot R&B Singles chart. It was certified gold by the Recording Industry Association of America (RIAA), for shipments of 500,000 copies in the United States. "Anniversary" was well received by music critics, including Robert Christgau, who named it the 13th best song of 1993. It earned the group Grammy Award nominations for Best R&B Song and Best R&B Performance by a Duo or Group with Vocals in 1994.

Music and lyrics 

"Anniversary" was recorded for the group's third album Sons of Soul, which was recorded and released in 1993. It was produced by Tony! Toni! Toné! and written by group member Raphael Wiggins and keyboardist Carl Wheeler.

The song is a romantic, elegant slow jam, with lush strings, lavish vocal harmonies, moody violin, and a long instrumental break. Musically, the group wanted to create a feeling similar to Isaac Hayes' 1969 song "By the Time I Get to Phoenix". Its lyrics are about mature, lasting love: "I've only made plans to hold your little hand/ It's our anniversary." Molly Reed of The Times-Picayune views that the lyrics' "pure sentiment" evokes "the 'sugar pie, honey bun' days of Motown soul", citing the line "I've only made plans / to hold your little hand / It's our anniversary".

Chart performance 
"Anniversary" was released by Mercury and Polygram Records on September 14, 1993. It received considerable radio exposure and sales in the United States. In the week of September 29, it climbed from number 84 to number 44 on Billboard Hot 100, making it one of the singles with the widest radio exposure and the greatest sales gains. "Anniversary" spent 20 weeks on the chart, peaking at number 10 on October 23. Its music video was released in October and featured the group in attire associated with English Romanticism and dandyism, including Dolce & Gabbana velvet vests, pin-striped jackets, lace bows, and cuffed shirts. On November 17, 1993, the single was certified gold by the Recording Industry Association of America (RIAA).

In Canada, "Anniversary" charted for nine weeks and peaked at number 44 on January 17, 1994. In New Zealand, it charted for eight weeks and peaked at number 16. In Australia, it charted for 8 weeks and peaked at number 70.

Critical reception 
Jonathan Bernstein of Spin called "Anniversary" "a song for all seasons." Elysa Gardner of Vibe wrote that "Sons of Soul climaxes, so to speak, with [the song]", saying the romantic slow jam has elements of bolero and lyrics bestowing warmth and respect upon its female subject. Robert Christgau of The Village Voice also cited it as a highlight on the album. He later ranked the song number 13 on his list of the year's best singles. In 1994, "Anniversary" was nominated for Grammy Awards for Best R&B Song and Best R&B Performance by a Duo or Group with Vocals. However, it lost to Janet Jackson's "That's the Way Love Goes" (1993) and Sade's "No Ordinary Love" (1992), respectively, at the 36th Grammy Awards.

Personnel 
Credits adapted from 7-inch pressing (Wing #859566).
 Tony! Toni! Toné! – arranger, producer
 Clare Fischer – string arrangement 
 Gerry Brown – mixing
 Ed Eckstine – executive producer
 Enrique Badulescu – photography

Other versions 

An instrumental version of the song was covered by jazz saxophonist Gerald Albright on his 1994 album, Smooth.

Charts

Weekly charts

Year-end charts

References

External links 
 

1993 singles
Songs written by Raphael Saadiq
Tony! Toni! Toné! songs
1993 songs
Mercury Records singles
Contemporary R&B ballads
1990s ballads